Steffen Menze (born 28 January 1969 in Plauen, East Germany) is a German football coach and former player.

Honours
 DFB-Pokal runner-up: 2000–01
 NOFV-Pokal runner-up: 1990–91

References

External links
 

1969 births
Living people
People from Plauen
People from Bezirk Karl-Marx-Stadt
East German footballers
German footballers
Association football midfielders
Footballers from Saxony
DDR-Oberliga players
2. Bundesliga players
Eisenhüttenstädter FC Stahl players
1. FC Frankfurt players
BFC Siófok players
FC St. Pauli players
1. FC Pforzheim players
Hannover 96 players
Eintracht Frankfurt players
FSV Zwickau players
1. FC Union Berlin players
Kickers Offenbach players
German football managers
Dynamo Dresden non-playing staff
Dynamo Dresden managers
SV Waldhof Mannheim managers
3. Liga managers
German expatriate footballers
German expatriate sportspeople in Hungary
Expatriate footballers in Hungary